Justice Stone may refer to:

People
Amherst W. Stone (1824–1900), associate justice of the Colorado Territorial Supreme Court
Clyde E. Stone (1876–1948), associate justice of the Supreme Court of Illinois
Edward Albert Stone (1844-1920), chief justice of the Supreme Court of Western Australia
Frederick Stone (1820–1899), associate judge of the Maryland Court of Appeals
George W. Stone (1811–1894), chief justice of the Alabama Supreme Court
Harlan F. Stone (1872–1946), associate justice and chief justice of the United States Supreme Court
Jesse N. Stone (1924–2001), associate justice of the Louisiana Supreme Court
John W. Stone (1838–1922), associate justice of the Michigan Supreme Court
Leonard Stone (judge) (1896–unknown), last British chief justice of the High Court of Bombay
Raymond Stone (fl. 1900s), associate justice of the Supreme Court of Guam
Royal A. Stone (1875–1942), associate justice of the Minnesota Supreme Court
Walter F. Stone (1822–1874), associate justice of the Ohio Supreme Court
Wilbur F. Stone (1833–1920), associate justice of the Colorado Supreme Court
William B. Stone (1797–1872), associate judge of the Maryland Court of Appeals

Other
The Justice Stone, fictional artifact in The Monarchy (comics)

See also
Judge Stone (disambiguation)